John Arnold House may refer to:

Dr. John Arnold Farm, Rushville, Indiana, listed on the National Register of Historic Places (NRHP) in Rush County
John Arnold House (Paint Lick, Kentucky), listed on the NRHP in Garrard County
John Waterman Arnold House, Warwick, Rhode Island, listed on the NRHP
John Arnold House (Woonsocket, Rhode Island), listed on the NRHP

See also
Arnold House (disambiguation)